The Grand Duchy of Moscow, or simply Muscovy (from the Latin ), was a Rus' principality of the Late Middle Ages centered on Moscow, and the predecessor state of the Tsardom of Russia in the early modern period. It was ruled by a branch of the Rurik dynasty, which had reigned in Kievan Rus' since its foundation.

The state originated in 1263, when the prince of Vladimir-Suzdal Alexander Nevsky created the Grand Principality of Moscow as an appanage for his son Daniel I. Initially, Muscovy was a vassal state to the Golden Horde, paying the khans homage, tribute and troops to fight in their wars. Moscow eclipsed and eventually absorbed its parent duchy of Vladimir-Suzdal by the 1320s, and later annexed several neighbors including the Novgorod Republic in 1478 and the Principality of Tver in 1485. It remained a vassal state of the Golden Horde until 1480 following the Great Stand on the Ugra River, though there were frequent uprisings and several successful military campaigns against the Mongols, such as an uprising led by Dmitri Donskoy against the ruler of the Golden Horde, Mamai, in the Battle of Kulikovo in 1380.

Ivan III further consolidated the state during his 43-year reign, campaigning against his major remaining rival power, the Grand Duchy of Lithuania, and by 1503 he had tripled the territory of his realm. Ivan's successor Vasili III also enjoyed military success, gaining Smolensk from Lithuania in 1512 and pushing Muscovy's borders to the Dnieper. Vasili's son Ivan IV (later known as Ivan the Terrible) was crowned in 1547, assuming the title of tsar together with the proclamation of the Tsardom of Russia (Tsarstvo Russkoye).

Name 

The Muscovy state in this period is also known as Muscovite Russia, Muscovite Rus', or the Grand Principality of Moscow.

The English names Moscow and Muscovy, for the city, the principality, and the river, descend from post-classical Latin ,  (compare Russian , "principality of Moscow"), and ultimately from the Old East Slavic fully vocalized accusative form . In Latin, the Moscow principality was also historically referred to as Ruthenia Alba.

As with many medieval states, the country had no "official" name, but rather official titles for their rulers. "The Prince (Knyaz) of Moscow" or "the Sovereign of Moscow" were common short titles. After the unification with the Duchy of Vladimir in the mid-14th century, the dukes of Moscow might call themselves also "the Duke of Vladimir and Moscow", as Vladimir was much older than Moscow and much more "prestigious" in the hierarchy of possessions, although the principal residence of the dukes had always been in Moscow. In rivalry with other duchies (especially the Grand Duchy of Tver) Moscow dukes also designated themselves as the "Grand Dukes", claiming a higher position in the hierarchy of Russian dukes. During the territorial growth and later acquisitions, the full title became rather lengthy. In routine documents and on seals, though, various short names were applied: "the (Grand) Duke of Moscow", "the Sovereign of Moscow", "the Grand Duke of all Rus, "the Sovereign of all Rus, or simply "the Grand Duke" or "the Great (or Grand) Sovereign". The Golden Horde appointed Ivan Kalita to the throne of "All Russia" while Simeon the Proud took the title of Grand Duke of All Russia.

In spite of feudalism, the collective name of the Eastern Slavic land, Rus', was not forgotten, though it then became a cultural and geographical rather than the political term, as there was no single political entity on the territory. Since the 14th century various Moscow dukes added "of all Rus to their titles, after the title of Russian metropolitans, "the Metropolitan of all Rus. Dmitry Shemyaka (died 1453) was the first Moscow duke who minted coins with the title "the Sovereign of all Rus. Although initially both "Sovereign" and "all Rus was supposed to be rather honorific epithets, since Ivan III is transformed into the political claim over the territory of all the former Kievan Rus', a goal that the Moscow duke came closer to by the end of that century, uniting eastern Rus'.

Such claims raised much opposition and hostility from its main rival, the Grand Duchy of Lithuania, which controlled a large (western) portion of the land of ancient Rus' and hence denied any claims and even the self-name of the eastern neighbor. Under the Polish-Lithuanian influence the country began to be called Muscovy (Muscovy) in Western Europe. The first appearances of the term were in an Italian document of 1500. Initially Moscovia was the Latinized name of the city of Moscow itself, not of the state; later it acquired its wider meaning (synecdoche) and has been used alongside the older name, Russia. The term Muscovy persisted in the West until the beginning of the 18th century and is still used in historical contexts. The term remains current in Arabic as an alternative name for Russia. Derived from it is al-Muskubīya (المسكوبية), the Arabic name of the Russian Compound district of Jerusalem, where Czarist Russia established various institutions in the 19th century, and hence also the name of the Al-Moskobiya Detention Centre located there.

Ivan III claimed the title of "Sovereign and Grand Duke of all Rus. By his marriage to Sophia Palaiologina, niece of Constantine XI Palaiologos, the last Byzantine emperor, he claimed Muscovy to be the successor state of the Roman Empire, the "Third Rome". The immigration of Byzantine people influenced and strengthened Moscow's identity as the heir of Orthodox traditions.

Origin 
When the Mongols invaded the lands of Kievan Rus' in the 13th century, Moscow was still a tiny town within the principality of Vladimir-Suzdal. Although the Mongols burnt down Moscow in the winter of 1238 and pillaged it in 1293, the outpost's remote, forested location offered some security from Mongol attacks and occupation, while a number of rivers provided access to the Baltic and Black Seas and to the Caucasus region. Muscovites, Suzdalians and other inhabitants of the Rus' principality were able to maintain their Slavic, pagan, and Orthodox traditions for the most part under the Tatar Yoke.

More important to the development of the state of Moscow, however, was its rule by a series of princes who expanded its borders and turned a small principality in the Moscow River Basin into the largest state in Europe of the 16th century. The first ruler of the principality of Moscow, Daniel I (d. 1303), was the youngest son of Alexander Nevsky of Vladimir-Suzdal. He started to expand his principality by seizing Kolomna and securing the bequest of Pereslavl-Zalessky to his family. Daniel's son Yury (also known as Georgiy; ruled 1303–1325) controlled the entire basin of the Moskva River and expanded westward by conquering Mozhaisk. He then allied with the overlord of the Rus' principalities, Uzbeg Khan of the Golden Horde, and married the khan's sister. The Khan allowed Yuriy to claim the title of Grand Duke of Vladimir-Suzdal, a position which allowed him to interfere in the affairs of the Novgorod Republic to the north-west.

By the early 14th century, Moscow had improved its standing against other towns within its parent duchy of Vladimir-Suzdal, and by the 1320s, it emerged as the most influential, largely due to decisions made by the Mongol khan; aside from this, the metropolitan bishop of Rus’ started to be based in Moscow too.

Yuriy's successor, Ivan I (ruled 1325–1340), managed to retain the title of Grand Duke by cooperating closely with the Mongols and by collecting tribute and taxes from other Rus' principalities on their behalf. This relationship enabled Ivan to gain regional ascendancy, particularly over Moscow's chief rival, the northern city of Tver, which rebelled against the Horde in 1327. The uprising was subdued by the joint forces of the Grand Duchy of Suzdal, the Grand Duchy of Moscow (which competed with Tver for the title of the Grand Duke of Vladimir), and Tatars. Ivan was reputed to be the richest person in Rus', as his moniker "Kalita" (literally, the "moneybag") testifies. He used his treasures to purchase land in other principalities and to finance the construction of stone churches in the Moscow Kremlin.

In 1325 the Orthodox Metropolitan Peter (died 1326) transferred his residence from Kiev to Vladimir and then to Moscow, further enhancing the prestige of the new principality.

Dmitri Donskoi 

Ivan's successors continued gathering the lands of Rus' to increase the population and wealth under their rule. In the process, their interests clashed with the expanding Grand Duchy of Lithuania, whose subjects were predominantly East Slavic and Orthodox. Grand Duke Algirdas of Lithuania allied himself by marriage with Tver and undertook three expeditions against Moscow (1368, 1370, 1372) but was unable to take it. The main bone of contention between Moscow and Vilnius was the large city of Smolensk.

In the 1350s, the country and the royal family were hit by the Black Death. Dmitry Ivanovich was aged nine when his parents died and the title of Grand Duke slipped into the hands of his distant relative, Dmitry of Suzdal. Surrounded by Lithuanians and Muslim nomads, the ruler of Moscow cultivated an alliance with the Rus' Orthodox Church, which experienced a resurgence in influence, due to the monastic reform of St. Sergius of Radonezh.

Educated by Metropolitan Alexis, Dmitri posed as a champion of Orthodoxy and managed to unite the warring principalities of Rus' in his struggle against the Horde. He challenged Khan's authority and defeated his commander Mamai in the epic Battle of Kulikovo (1380). However, the victory did not bring any short-term benefits; Tokhtamysh in 1382 sacked Moscow hoping to reassert his vested authority over his vassal, the Grand Prince, and his own Mongol hegemony, killing 24,000 people.

Nevertheless, Dmitri became a national hero. The memory of Kulikovo Field made the Rus' population start believing in their ability to end Tatar domination and become a free people. In 1389, he passed the throne to his son Vasily I without bothering to obtain the Khan's sanction.

Vasily I and Vasily II 

Vasily I (1389–1425) continued the policies of his father. After the Horde was attacked by Tamerlane, he desisted from paying tribute to the Khan but was forced to pursue a more conciliatory policy after Edigu's incursion on Moscow in 1408. Married to the only daughter of the Grand Duke Vytautas of Lithuania, he attempted to avoid open conflicts with his powerful father-in-law, even when the latter annexed Smolensk. The peaceful years of his long reign were marked by the continuing expansion to the east (annexation of Nizhny Novgorod and Suzdal, 1392) and to the north (annexation of Vologda, Veliky Ustyug, and Perm of Vychegda, 1398). Nizhny Novgorod was given by the Khan of the Golden Horde as a reward for Muscovite help against a rival.

The reforms of St. Sergius triggered a cultural revival, exemplified by the icons and frescoes of the monk Andrei Rublev. Hundreds of monasteries were founded by disciples of St. Sergius in distant and inhospitable locations, including Beloozero and Solovki. Apart from their cultural functions, these monasteries were major landowners that could control the economy of an adjacent region. In fact, they served as outposts of Moscow influence in the neighboring principalities and republics. Another factor responsible for the expansion of the Grand Duchy of Moscow was its favorable dynastic situation, in which each sovereign was succeeded by his son, while rival principalities were plagued by dynastic strife and splintered into ever-smaller polities. The only lateral branch of the House of Moscow, represented by Vladimir of Serpukhov and his descendants, was firmly anchored to the Moscow Duchy.

The situation changed with the ascension of Vasily I's successor, Vasily II (r. 1425–62). Before long his uncle, Yuri of Zvenigorod, started to advance his claims to the throne and Monomakh's Cap. A bitter family conflict erupted and rocked the country during the whole reign. After Yuri's death in 1432, the claims were taken up by his sons, Vasily Kosoy and Dmitry Shemyaka, who pursued the Great Feudal War well into the 1450s. Although he was ousted from Moscow on several occasions, taken prisoner by Olug Moxammat of Kazan, and blinded in 1446, Vasily II eventually managed to triumph over his enemies and pass the throne to his son. At his urging, a native bishop was elected as Metropolitan of Moscow, which was tantamount to a declaration of independence of the Russian Orthodox Church from the Patriarch of Constantinople (1448).

Ivan III 

Outward expansion of the Grand Duchy in the 14th and 15th centuries was accompanied by internal consolidation. By the 15th century, the rulers of Moscow considered the entire Rus' territory their collective property. Various semi-independent princes of Rurikid stock still claimed specific territories, but Ivan III (the Great; r. 1462–1505) forced the lesser princes to acknowledge the grand prince of Moscow and his descendants as unquestioned rulers with control over military, judicial, and foreign affairs.

Moscow gained full sovereignty over a significant part of the ethnically Rus' lands by 1480, when the overlordship of the Tatar Golden Horde officially ended after its defeat in the Great Stand on the Ugra River. By the beginning of the 16th century, virtually all those lands were united, including the Novgorod Republic (annexed in 1478) and the Grand Duchy of Tver (annexed in 1485). Through inheritance, Ivan was able to control the important Principality of Ryazan, and the princes of Rostov and Yaroslavl' subordinated themselves to him. The northwestern city of Pskov, consisting of the city and a few surrounding lands, remained independent in this period, but Ivan's son, Vasili III (r. 1505–33), later conquered it.

Having consolidated the core of Russia under his rule, Ivan III became the first Moscow ruler to adopt the titles of tsar and "Ruler of all Rus'". Ivan competed with his powerful northwestern rival, the Grand Duchy of Lithuania, for control over some of the semi-independent former principalities of Kievan Rus' in the upper Dnieper and Donets river basins. Through the defections of some princes, border skirmishes, and the long inconclusive Russo-Lithuanian Wars that ended only in 1503, Ivan III was able to push westward, and the Moscow state tripled in size under his rule.

The reign of the Tsars started officially with Ivan the Terrible, the first monarch to be crowned Tsar of Russia, but in practice, it started with Ivan III, who completed the centralization of the state (traditionally known as the gathering of the Russian lands).

Court 
The court of the Moscow princes combined ceremonies and customs inherited from Kievan Rus' with those imported from the Byzantine Empire and Golden Horde. Some traditional Russian offices, like that of tysyatsky and veche, were gradually abolished in order to consolidate power in the hands of the ruling prince. A new elaborate system of court precedence, or mestnichestvo, predicated the nobleman's rank and function on the rank and function of his ancestors and other members of his family. The highest echelon of hereditary nobles was composed of boyars. They fell into three categories:

Rurikid princes of Upper Oka towns, Suzdal, Rostov, Yaroslavl, etc. that lived in Moscow after their hereditary principalities had been incorporated into Duchy of Moscow (e.g., Shuisky, Vorotynsky, Repnin, Romodanovsky);
Foreign princes from Lithuania and Golden Horde, claiming descent either from Grand Duke Gediminas (e.g., Belsky, Mstislavsky, Galitzine, Trubetskoy) or from Genghis Khan;
 Ancient families of Moscow nobility that have been recorded in the service of Grand Dukes from the 14th century (e.g., Romanov, Godunov, Sheremetev).

Rurikid and Gediminid boyars, whose fathers and grandfathers were independent princelings, felt that they were kin to the grand prince and hence almost equal to him. During the times of dynastic troubles (such as the years of Ivan IV's minority), boyardom constituted an internal force that was a permanent threat to the throne. An early form of the monarch's conflict with the boyars was the oprichnina policy of Ivan the Terrible.

During such conflicts, Ivan, Boris Godunov, and some later monarchs felt the necessity to counterbalance the boyardom by creating a new kind of nobility, based on personal devotion to the tsar and merits earned by faithful service, rather than by heredity. Later these new nobles were called dvoryans (singular: dvoryanin). The name comes from the Russian word dvor, meaning tsar's dvor, i.e., The Court. Hence the expression pozhalovat ko dvoru, i.e., to be called to (serve) The Court.

Relations with the Horde

Relations between the Moscow principality and the Horde were mixed. In the first two decades of the 13th century Moscow gained the support of one of the rivaling Mongol statesmen, Nogai, against the principalities that were oriented towards Sarai khans. After the restoration of unity in the Golden Horde in the early 14th century, it generally enjoyed the favor of khans until 1317, but lost it in 1322–1327. The following thirty years, when the relations between the two states improved, allowed Moscow to achieve sufficient economic and political potential. Further attempts to deprive its rulers of the status of grand dukes of Vladimir were unsuccessful after the Khanate sank into internecine war and proved to be fruitless during the reign of a relatively powerful khan such as Mamai, whereas Tokhtamysh had no other choice but to recognize the supremacy of Moscow over northern and eastern Russian lands. The traditional Mongol principle of breaking up larger concentrations of power into smaller ones failed, and the following period is characterized by the lack of support from the Horde. Although Moscow recognized khans as the legitimate authority in the early years of the Tatar yoke, despite certain acts of resistance and disobedience, it refused to acknowledge their suzerainty in the years 1374–1380, 1396–1411, 1414–1416 and 1417–1419, even in spite of the growing might of the Golden Horde. The power of the Horde over Moscow was greatly limited in the reign of Dmitri Donskoi, who gained recognition of the Grand Duchy of Vladimir as a hereditary possession of Moscow princes: while the Horde collected tribute from his land, it could no longer have a serious impact on the internal structure of northern Russian lands. In the years of Vasily II and Ivan III, the Grand Duchy of Moscow acquired the idea of tsardom from the fallen Byzantine Empire, which was incompatible with the recognition of the suzerainty of the khan, and started to declare its independence in diplomatic relations with other countries. This process was complete by the reign of Ivan III.

Assessment 
The development of the modern-day Russian state is traced from Kievan Rus' through Vladimir-Suzdal and the Grand Duchy of Moscow to the Tsardom of Russia, and then the Russian Empire. The Moscow Duchy drew people and wealth to the northeastern part of Kievan Rus'; established trade links to the Baltic Sea, White Sea, Caspian Sea, and to Siberia; and created a highly centralized and autocratic political system. The political traditions established in Muscovy, therefore, exerted a powerful influence on the future development of Russian society.

Society 
Structure
 Muscovite manorialism

Class
 Izgoi
 Kholop
 Posad people
 Service class people
 Smerd

Culture 
Muscovite Russia was culturally influenced by Slavic and Byzantine cultural elements. In Muscovite Russia supernaturalism was a fundamental part of daily life.

See also 

 Foreign policy of the Russian Empire
 List of Russian rulers
 Muscovite–Lithuanian Wars

References

Sources
 
 Moss, Walter G (2005). "History of Russia - Volume 1: To 1917", Anthem Press, p. 80

Further reading 

 Chester Dunning, The Russian Empire and the Grand Duchy of Muscovy: A Seventeenth Century French Account
 
 Marshall Poe, Foreign Descriptions of Muscovy: An Analytic Bibliography of Primary and Secondary Sources, Slavica Publishers, 1995, 
  - Russia

External links
 

 
States and territories established in 1283
States and territories disestablished in 1547
1263 establishments in Europe
13th-century establishments in Russia
1547 disestablishments in Europe
Grand Duchy of Moscow
Former monarchies of Europe
13th century in Russia
14th century in Russia
15th century in Russia
16th century in Russia
16th century in Moscow
States and territories disestablished in the 1540s
Former countries
Vassal and tributary states of the Golden Horde
Christian states